Voice foley is the non-talking "foley" or sound effects, that a voice actor makes to enhance a performance. Such sounds include grunts, groans, breaths, wheezing, humming and many more.

See also 
 Michael Winslow
 Foley (filmmaking)
 Voice acting in Japan

Acting
Sound recording